Jennifer Stone (born February 12, 1993) is an American actress and nurse. She is known for playing Harper Finkle on the Disney Channel Original series Wizards of Waverly Place (2007–2012) and in the Disney Channel Original Movie Wizards of Waverly Place: The Movie (2009). She has also played roles in various television films, including a voice role in Dadnapped (2009), the main character in Harriet the Spy: Blog Wars (2010) and Abby Hanover in Mean Girls 2 (2011). Stone received critical acclaim for her work on the independent film The In-Between (2019), which she wrote and starred in.

Acting 

Stone was first cast as Martha in Secondhand Lions, for which she received a Young Artist Award nomination. She recalls having recognized Michael Caine from Miss Congeniality only while on the set of Secondhand Lions. Stone also received a Young Artist Award nomination for her guest appearance on House, and guest appeared on Line of Fire and Without a Trace. In 2007, she joined the main cast of Disney's Wizards of Waverly Place as Harper. Stone notes Gilda Radner as one of her biggest influences.

In 2009, she had a voice role in the Disney Channel Original Movie Dadnapped. She also lent her voice to Phineas and Ferb as the voice of Amanda, Candace's daughter in the future in two episodes. In 2010, she played Harriet in the film Harriet the Spy: Blog Wars, based on the book of the same title by Louise Fitzhugh, which she later admitted she had not read before starring in the film. She later starred in the film Nothing Left to Fear and the  television film High School Possession.

Nursing 
Stone is a registered nurse. In July 2019, Stone testified before the Senate for the JDRF, describing her experience with diabetes. Stone finished nursing school in December 2019, as news of the COVID-19 pandemic broke, and she mentioned in several interviews that she would be "joining the front lines" on the fight against the disease. , Stone made regular Instagram updates about her work in the hospital. , she was working in the emergency room at a hospital in Burbank.

Personal life 
Stone was diagnosed with latent autoimmune diabetes in adults (LADA), also sometimes referred to as Type 1.5 diabetes, when she was 20 years old. She left acting at that time to study for a university degree, first in psychology and later switching to nursing, so that she could get a better understanding of her disease. In January 2018, she was interviewed on the Diabetes Connections podcast about her diagnosis, and how it has affected her life and career. In 2022, she appeared as a spokesperson for Medtronic's insulin pen product.

Filmography

Awards and nominations

References

External links

21st-century American actresses
Actresses from Texas
American child actresses
American film actresses
American television actresses
Living people
 People with type 1 diabetes
American women nurses
1993 births
American health activists